Astrit is an Albanian masculine given name and may refer to:
Astrit Ajdarević (born 1990), Albanian footballer 
Astrit Bushati (born 1962), Albanian footballer
Astrit Fazliu (born 1987), Kosovar-Albanian footballer
Astrit Hafizi (born 1953), Albanian footballer and coach
Astrit Patozi (born 1964), Albanian politician 
Astrit Selmani (born 1997), Kosovan footballer 
Astrit Ziu (born 1946), Albanian footballer

See also
Astrid

Albanian masculine given names